"Irresistible" is a song written and recorded by British singer-songwriter Steve Harley. It was released three times as a single; the first being in 1985 as a non-album single under his band's name Steve Harley & Cockney Rebel In 1986, a remixed version of the song was released by Harley as a solo single in the UK, and in 1992, he re-released this version as a single in Europe from his solo album Yes You Can. "Irresistible" was written by Harley and produced by English producer Mickie Most.

1985 version

Background
"Irresistible" was first performed live at Steve Harley & Cockney Rebel's concert at Camden Palace, London, in December 1984. The concert was recorded for a TV broadcast and was released on VHS as Live from London in 1985. This performance of "Irresistible" used lead guitar as a more dominant instrument and featured a verse that was not included in the studio version.

Harley originally offered "Irresistible" to Rod Stewart. The singer expressed an interest in recording it, but knowing how keen Harley was for a hit of his own, he ultimately encouraged Harley to record it himself in the hope that it would put him back in the charts. In a 1985 interview, Harley commented, "I think it's gonna be a single, it's the one Rod's gone away with. [He] wants it as a single, but I want it, I think it's my new 'Make Me Smile'. I think it's a hit [for] anybody. I'm not boasting, I just believe that."

After signing a five-album recording contract with Mickie Most's label RAK, Harley recorded "Irresistible" in 1985 with Most at the producer's helm. It featured Harvey Hinsley on guitar, Adrian Lee on keyboards and Mark Brzezicki of Big Country on drums. Harley told the Daily Mirror in 1985, "I wrote the song for Rod Stewart, but when he heard it he told me it was so good I should do it myself. So I did."

"Irresistible" was released in May 1985 as Harley's debut single for RAK. It peaked at number 81 in the UK Singles Chart and remained in the top 100 for five weeks. Speaking of the song to the Newcastle Journal in 1985, Harley said, "'Irresistible' is pure me. The more I hear it, the more I'm proud of it. It has got its own sound."

Release
"Irresistible" was released by RAK Records as a 7-inch and 12-inch single in the UK, the Netherlands, Germany and Portugal. The B-side, "Such is Life", was written by Harley and produced by Most. It was exclusive to the single and has not appeared on any other release with the exception of the 1988 Steve Harley & Cockney Rebel compilation The Collection. "Such is Life" received its live debut during Cockney Rebel's 1980 UK Christmas tour.

For the 12-inch release, an extended version of "Irresistible" was made by Harley, with Calvin Hayes and Mike Nocito, who would both soon achieve fame in Johnny Hates Jazz. At the time, Hayes, being Most's son, was an A&R man at RAK, while Nocito was an in-house engineer. Cockney Rebel's 1973 song "Sebastian" was included as an additional track on the 12-inch release. Following the song's release as a single, the version has made its only outside appearance on the 1988 compilation The Collection.

Music video
The song's music video was directed by Marcelo Anciano and produced by AWOG. It features Harley performing the song in a dark room with the use of various lighting and spotlight tricks throughout. RAK booked the use of a studio in West London to shoot the video.

Critical reception
On its release, Di Cross of Record Mirror described Harley as a "purveyor of the perfect pop song" and considered "Irresistible" to be "a catchy little number" adding that it is "not quite Cockney Rebel, but then Steve isn't 21 anymore." In another issue of Record Mirror, "Irresistible" was one of a number of singles reviewed by ABC. Mark White commented that the song "sounds like it was written, arranged and produced on a poolside in LA", and David Yarritu added, "This would be good if someone like Lulu was singing it... jaunty, I liked the marimbas." Phil Murphy of Newcastle Journal commented on the unlikely blend of pairing of Harley's "original melodic rock" and Most's "sometimes crass pop". He added, "An ironic letter home from a soldier in Belfast, it is couched in jaunty love song format and works well."

Max Bell of Number One wrote, "Irresistible? Hardly. Remember 'Mr Soft'? 'Come Up and See Me, Make Me Smile'? You don't? You're not missing much, except that they were a thousand times more entertaining than this hackneyed dirge. Knock it on the head Steve, there's a good chap." In his 1990 book The Penguin Encyclopedia of Popular Music, Donald Clarke noted, "Harley came back in '85 and skirted the charts with the catchy 'Irresistible'."

Track listing
7-inch single (UK, the Netherlands, Germany and Portugal)
"Irresistible" – 3:30
"Such is Life" – 3:52

12-inch single (UK and Germany)
"Irresistible" (Extended Version) – 4:07
"Sebastian" – 5:42
"Such is Life" – 3:52

Personnel 
Irresistible
 Steve Harley – vocals
 Harvey Hinsley – guitar
 Adrian Lee – keyboards
 Mark Brzezicki – drums

Production
 Mickie Most – producer
 Mike Nocito – engineer, remixer of "Irresistible (Extended Version)"
 Steve Harley – remixer of "Irresistible (Extended Version)"
 Calvin Hayes – remixer of "Irresistible (Extended Version)"
 Neil Harrison – producer of "Sebastian"

Other
 Crocodi Le Suite (London) – sleeve design

Charts

1986 version

Background
In 1986, "Irresistible" was remixed and released again as a single. For the new version, Harley worked with recording engineer Stuart Breed at Air Studios in London. Breed came to Harley's attention through Most, who knew of his work. For the remix, the pair used the original 1985 recording session on a 2-inch master tape. Breed and Harley mixed-and-matched parts of the track and experimented with equipment. The song ended up being sped-up and dramatically altered from its original form. The original version's guitar solo was replaced by a keyboard solo, which had been recorded during the original sessions with Most. The vocals used were from a different take from the original 1985 24-track 2-inch tape.

Speaking to Record Collector in 1992, Harley said of the remixing of "Irresistible", 

In 2013, the engineer Matt Butler recalled of the 1986 remix, 

Following the April 1986 release of Harley's second single for RAK, "Heartbeat Like Thunder", "Irresistible" was released in June 1986 as the lead single from Harley's forthcoming solo album El Gran Senor. Like its predecessor, the single failed to enter the top 100 of the UK Singles Chart, stalling at number 158. In May 1986, Harley announced his intention to embark on a UK tour in September 1986 to promote El Gran Senor. However, soon after the release of "Irresistible", RAK folded and was sold to EMI, which in turn resulted in the album being shelved and Harley left without a record deal. Some of the songs due to appear on the album would appear on Harley's 1992 album Yes You Can, including Breed's five-minute extended remix of "Irresistible" as the opening track. In 2015, Harley commented on the song, "I always thought it should be a hit. I found it hard to give up trying!"

Release
"Irresistible" was released by RAK Records as a 7-inch and 12-inch single in the UK only. The 12-inch single features the extended remix of "Irresistible". The colour picture sleeve features a photograph of Harley taken by John Stoddart. The B-side, "Lucky Man", was written by Harley and produced by Most. It was exclusive to the single and has not appeared on any other release since. The song features Mick Ronson on guitar and Mark Brzezicki on drums. Harley had first met Ronson in the 1970s and during his sessions with Most, Harley contacted Ronson and asked him to play guitar on the track. Harley later recalled, "Mick played guitar on 'Lucky Man'. It's a white reggae rhythm. Mick was as easy as could be, musically he was very quick and adaptable. I experimented with several guitar approaches, and naturally they were all well within his scope." Speaking to Classic Rock in 2008, Harley said, "I produced a track for myself in the mid-80s - a song called 'Lucky Man' - with Mick on electric guitar. It was difficult for me. Not that Ronno was a problem himself - you couldn't wish to meet a nicer, more generous man and musician - but I was in awe of him, even though we had socialised somewhat and shared a mutual respect."

Promotion
On 30 July 1986, Harley appeared on the BBC television chat show Wogan, presented by Terry Wogan, which featured a performance of "Irresistible". On 13 August, Harley also performed the song with his backing band on the ITV children's TV programme Razzamatazz.

Critical reception
In July 1986, the Newcastle Evening Chronicle reviewed the single and commented that the song was "as the title says". Andy Gill of New Musical Express described "Irresistible" as "fairly pleasant" but in reference to the sleeve he added, "Only Brian Eno can afford to recede that much and remain a celebrity, Steve." Robin Smith of Record Mirror wrote, "Out once again is this darn catchy song, all sweaty and breathless. I'd much rather listen to this than That Petrol Emotion or Easterhouse any day. Harley is now nearly as bald as Phil Collins. Is this a sign of further great things to come?" John Lee of the Huddersfield Daily Examiner described the song as "a bouncy and endearingly catchy number". He noted the song's failure to make "much impression" when originally released in 1985, but believed this time it would be a hit.

Track listing
7-inch single (UK)
"Irresistible" – 3:26
"Lucky Man" – 3:36

12-inch single (UK)
"Irresistible" (Extended Re-Mix) – 5:12
"Lucky Man" – 3:36

Personnel
Production
 Mickie Most – producer
 Stuart Breed – remixer
 Matt Butler – engineer

Other
 John Stoddart – photography
 Shoot That Tiger! – sleeve design

Charts

1992 re-release

Background
In 1992, "Irresistible" was released for the third and final time as a single. A re-release of Breed's 1986 remix, the song was released in Europe as the lead single from Harley's third solo album Yes You Can. In his 1992 interview with Record Collector, Harley said, "I've just released a new album called Yes You Can in Europe, but it's not out in this country [UK]. I'm very proud of it. 'Irresistible' is out over there as a single – it was never released over there at the time."

Release
"Irresistible" was released as a CD single by Comeuppance Ltd in Europe. The release included a new "Radio Edit" of the song, Breed's extended remix (also the album version on Yes You Can), and a B-side titled "The Waggon". The single was mastered by Steve Rooke and Ian Jones at Abbey Road Studios in London. On the release, as well as Yes You Can, production was credited to Most and Harley.

"The Waggon" was written by Harley, and produced by Harley and Matt Butler. An earlier version of the song originally appeared as the B-side to Harley's 1989 single "When I'm with You", where it was titled "The Theme from Babbacombe Lee".

Critical reception
Dave Thompson of AllMusic spoke of the song in a review of Yes You Can, "There are some heartwarming moments on this album. 'Irresistible' very nearly is..."

Track listing
CD single (Europe)
"Irresistible" (Radio Edit) – 3:21
"Irresistible" (Album Version) – 5:04
"The Waggon" – 3:04

Personnel
Production
 Steve Harley – producer on "Irresistible" and "The Waggon"
 Mickie Most – producer on "Irresistible"
 Stuart Breed – remixer on "Irresistible"
 Matt Butler – producer on "The Waggon"
 Ian Jones, Steve Rooke – mastering

Other
 Kevin Williamson, Mike Simister – illustration
 Steven D. Schwachter – art layout, design

References

1985 songs
1985 singles
1986 singles
1992 singles
RAK Records singles
Steve Harley songs
Songs written by Steve Harley
Song recordings produced by Mickie Most